The 2018–19 season is Lincoln City's 135th season in their history and their second season back in League Two after missing out on the League Two playoff final in the 2017/2018 season. Along with League Two, the club also participates in the FA Cup, and has been eliminated from the EFL Cup and EFL Trophy.

The season covers the period from 1 July 2018 to 30 June 2019.

Transfers & Contracts

Transfers in

Transfers out

Loans in

Loans out

New contracts

Competitions

Friendlies
As of 7 June 2018, Lincoln City have announced six pre-season friendlies against Blackburn Rovers, Sheffield Wednesday, Lincoln United Boston United, Norwich City and  Scunthorpe United

League Two

League table

Results summary

Results by matchday

Matches

FA Cup

The first round draw was made live on BBC by Dennis Wise and Dion Dublin on 22 October. The draw for the second round was made live on BBC and BT by Mark Schwarzer and Glenn Murray on 12 November. The third round draw was made live on BBC by Ruud Gullit and Paul Ince from Stamford Bridge on 3 December 2018.

EFL Cup

On 15 June 2018, the draw for the first round was made in Vietnam. The second round draw was made from the Stadium of Light on 16 August.

EFL Trophy
On 13 July 2018, the initial group stage draw bar the U21 invited clubs was announced. The draw for the second round was made live on Talksport by Leon Britton and Steve Claridge on 16 November.

Squad statistics

Appearances 

|-
|colspan="12" style="text-align:center;" |Players no longer at the club
|-

|-
|}

References

Lincoln City F.C. seasons
Lincoln City